Isolated Peak is a  summit in British Columbia, Canada.

Description
Isolated Peak is located in Yoho National Park, in the Waputik Mountains of the Canadian Rockies. Precipitation runoff from Isolated Peak drains into tributaries of the Yoho River which in turn is a tributary of the Kicking Horse River. The peak is visible from Highway 1 (the Trans-Canada Highway). The nearest higher neighbor is Mount McArthur,  to the west.

History

The first ascent of the mountain was made in 1901 by Edward Whymper and James Outram with guides Christian Kaufmann, Christian Klucker, Joseph Pollinger, and Joseph Bossoney. At that time the peak was an isolated nunatak in the middle of a glacier and Whymper, who named the peak, also called the peak "Insular" in addition to Isolated. The mountain's toponym was officially adopted on March 31, 1924, by the Geographical Names Board of Canada.

Geology

Isolated Peak is composed of sedimentary rock laid down during the Precambrian to Jurassic periods. Formed in shallow seas, this sedimentary rock was pushed east and over the top of younger rock during the Laramide orogeny.

Climate

Based on the Köppen climate classification, Isolated Peak is located in a subarctic climate zone with cold, snowy winters, and mild summers. Winter temperatures can drop below −20 °C with wind chill factors below −30 °C. This climate supports the McArthur Glacier on the west slope of the peak and Glacier des Poilus to the north.

Gallery

See also
Geography of British Columbia

References

External links
 Isolated Peak: Weather forecast
 Parks Canada web site: Yoho National Park

Two-thousanders of British Columbia
Canadian Rockies
Mountains of Yoho National Park
Kootenay Land District